This is a list of the members of the 10th Seanad Éireann, the upper house of the Oireachtas (legislature) of Ireland. These Senators were elected or appointed in 1961, after the 1961 general election and served until the close of poll for the 11th Seanad in 1965.

Composition of the 10th Seanad
There are a total of 60 seats in the Seanad. 43 Senators are elected by the Vocational panels, 6 elected by the Universities and 11 are nominated by the Taoiseach.

The following table shows the composition by party when the 10th Seanad first met on 14 December 1961.

List of senators

Changes

See also
Members of the 17th Dáil
Government of the 17th Dáil

References

External links

 
10